Zakir Hussain Rose Garden, is a botanical garden in Chandigarh, India and spread over  of land, with 50,000 rose-bushes of 1600 different species. Named after India's former president, Zakir Hussain and created in 1967 under the guidance of Mohinder Singh Randhawa, Chandigarh's first chief commissioner, the garden has the distinction of being Asia's largest. The garden has not only roses, but also trees of medicinal value. Some of the medicinal plants that can be spotted here are bel, bahera, harar, camphor and yellow gulmohar. The rose plants have been planted in carved-out lawns and flower beds.

Rose Garden has undergone several renovations and expansions. In 2003, a new section was added to the garden, which included a bonsai garden and a cactus house. In 2013, a rose festival was held at the garden to celebrate the 100th anniversary of the Indian Horticulture Society.

Apart from serving as a host of other events, the Zakir Hussain Rose Garden  serves as the venue for hosting an annual rose festival called Rose Festival, a major cultural event in Chandigarh during February or March. Celebrated mainly as a tribute to the magnificence of the rose itself, the attractions include food, drinks, joyrides, and contests of varying nature, such as photography, gardening, landscaping, bonsai, and Rose Prince and Princess. The contests are open to the residents or institutions from nearby places.

Gallery 
March 2016

References

External links

www.chandigarhcity.com Gardens of Chandigarh
https://chandigarhexplore.com/ Rose Garden Chandigarh
https://www.findinchd.in/ Rose Garden Chandigarh Full Tour Guide With Images
Gardens in India
Rose gardens
Tourist attractions in Chandigarh
Geography of Chandigarh